Estarm or Estarem or Estaram may refer to:
 Estarm, Kerman
 Estarem, Mazandaran